Tim Biskup (born September 21, 1967 in Santa Monica, California) is an American artist.

Early life and education 
Tim realized he wanted to become an artist when he visited the Centre Pompidou in 1984 with his family.  There he was exposed to the works of Roberto Matta, Niki de Saint Phalle, and Jean Tinguely.  He enrolled in the Otis College of Art and Design, Fine Art department in 1986 only to drop out in 1988. He stated in an interview that he was frustrated with the fact that there was an excessive emphasis on conceptualizing art, rather learning how to make art.

Career 
He works with playful and vibrant psychedelic imagery in the pop-design genre that emerged in the late 20th century through such diverse media as silkscreening, textile production, and rotocast vinyl.  He was a significant contributor to the GAMA-GO clothing line.

During his Ether Show in the summer of 2007, Biskup displayed works from his self-dubbed Baroque Modernist style based on fear, loss, and pain.

In 2017, Biskup opened the gallery and project space Face Guts located in Glassell Park, Los Angeles.

Biskup's 240 page retrospective monograph and autobiography, Tree of Life, was published in October 2019 by Chronicle Books which the LA Weekly described as showcasing "his unique hybrids of flourishes, atmospherics, geometry, gesture, character, figure, flora and fauna, and an intense, luminous, complex and nuanced supersaturated palette."

Published works
 Tree of Life (October 1, 2019) 
 Art and Design of Gama-Go (Gama Go) by Greg Long, Chris Edmundson, and Tim Biskup (Jun 15, 2007)
 Dark Horse Deluxe Journal: Tim Biskup (Jan 15, 2003) 
 Tim Biskup's 100 Paintings (Hardcover - April 21, 2004) 
 The Jackson 500 Volume 1 (Jun 22, 2005) 
 The Jackson 500 Volume 2 (Jun 28, 2006) 
 The Jackson 500 Volume 3 (Jul 4, 2007) 
 The Jackson 500 Volume 4 (Jan 26, 2010)

Products
Tim Biskup's Lucky Stack by Tim Biskup (box set cards - November 30, 2006) 
GAMA-GO Postcard Book  by Tim Biskup (unknown binding - April 2004)

References

20th-century American painters
American male painters
21st-century American painters
21st-century American male artists
1967 births
Living people
20th-century American male artists